Raymond Michael D'Arcy (born 1 September 1964) is an Irish television and radio presenter currently on his second stint at state broadcaster Raidió Teilifís Éireann (RTÉ). He once presented a self-titled weekday morning radio programme on the Denis O'Brien-owned Today FM. His professional partner on that show, Jenny Kelly, became his wife on 24 August 2013 and they have two children: Tom (born June 2012) and Kate (born 25 November 2006).

D'Arcy came to prominence with a television career on RTÉ, presenting children's television on The Den, a quiz show called Blackboard Jungle and the youth music show 2Phat. He presented television coverage of The Rose of Tralee beauty pageant each August for four consecutive years until 2010. He rejoined RTÉ in 2015.

Early life and career
D'Arcy was born into a working-class family of nine with one earner, his father, a non-commissioned officer, in Tipperary in 1964. His grandmother died at the age of 54 from lung cancer when D'Arcy was 11. Always into his music and his broadcasting, he began discoing in 1979 at the age of 15. He attended Trinity College Dublin, to take a degree in psychology, and graduated in 1985. He began a career at RTÉ Raidió na Gaeltachta and in 1988 moved to RTÉ television, with a presenter spot on Jo Maxi. His first spell at RTÉ lasted for 13 years.

D'Arcy replaced Ian Dempsey as the presenter of The Den, RTÉ's flagship children's television series, from 1990 to 1998. His career in children's television later featured in the 2008 documentary Best Bitz From Back Den. D'Arcy also presented the quiz show Blackboard Jungle at the time before presenting youth music quiz 2Phat. In addition, he presented the UTV and RTÉ collaborative travel show Bon Voyage! for one season. He has presented several once-off events, including Ireland's version of the Test The Nation franchise and the Irish Young Scientist Awards. Until 2005 he presented You're a Star, the talent show established to find Ireland's entrant for the Eurovision Song Contest. In 2005, D'Arcy took over as Rose of Tralee presenter. On 1 April 2010, after five years, he stood down so as to spend more time with his family as they grew older. Television roles dried up as the 2000s progressed, though he presented When Dreams Come True in 2005 and hosted Eurosong 2008 at the University of Limerick Concert Hall. and presented one episode of The Panel later that year. That same year, he ruled out applying to host The Late Late Show, despite being linked to this prime-time slot. On 1 December 2008, he announced on his Today FM radio show (see next paragraph) that he would be participating in the second season of Celebrity Bainisteoir; he managed County Kildare team Rathangan.

D'Arcy moved to Today FM radio in the late 1990s. He took over Tim Kelly's mid-morning show, which went out from 10:00 to 12:45. This slot was later changed to 9:00 to 12:00, entering direct competition with The Gerry Ryan Show on RTÉ 2fm. He credited much of the show's success to the team that served him well over the years: Jenny Kelly, Will Hanafin and Mairead Farrell. D'Arcy's Today FM show achieved something of a cult status due to its quirky segments, among which were "Fix-It Friday" and the "Odd One Out Quiz". In June 2008, D'Arcy was one of more than 1,200 people who stripped naked for a Spencer Tunick art project - he later spoke of the experience on the radio. On the weekend of 21–22 March 2009, someone placed nude images of the then Taoiseach in the National Gallery of Ireland and the gallery of the Royal Hibernian Academy. The artist anonymously emailed D'Arcy's radio show, claiming responsibility for the creation of the paintings, but not their hanging. Gardaí subsequently raided the Today FM studios and producer Will Hanafin was asked to hand over the emails, on the basis that the placing of the paintings constituted indecency, incitement and criminal damage. Hanafin refused to provide the emails without a warrant. In July 2014, D'Arcy incurred the wrath of mixed martial arts fans by inviting Cathal Pendred onto his show then grilling him on his part in the "violent and disturbing" sport.

A household name in Ireland, D'Arcy does not consider himself a celebrity and tends to decline requests for interviews. While being interviewed on The Saturday Night Show in 2010, D'Arcy issued an ultimatum to Enda Kenny, "vowing he would leave Ireland" after the February 2011 general election if the man became Taoiseach. Kenny did become Taoiseach; D'Arcy did not leave the country.

After being approached by RTÉ over the years and considering leaving Today FM, D'Arcy did just that abruptly in December 2014, quitting his Today FM show to rejoin RTÉ. It was later announced that his wife Jenny Kelly would join him at RTÉ to produce the new radio show. His first show back at RTÉ went out on 2 February 2015 on Radio 1. His show will air every weekday from 3 to 4.30pm.

On 26 September 2015, D'Arcy's new television talk-show called The Ray D'Arcy Show started on RTÉ One. On 6 October 2019 it was revealed that the show would only run from September to December and be replaced by a female-led chat show for the January to May run.

BAI compliance issues
D'arcy's programmes have been the source of several complaints to the Broadcasting Authority of Ireland. In December 2015 the BAI upheld three complaints (it partially upheld two complaints about the same broadcast and rejected two others) of bias about an interview D'Arcy had with Colm O'Gorman about Amnesty Ireland's campaign to change Ireland's laws on abortion. In May 2016, the BAI ruled for a second time that D'Arcy's programme lacked objectivity when he interviewed Graham Linehan and his wife, Helen, on her need to have an abortion in the UK following the discovery that a foetus she was carrying had a fatal abnormality. In December 2016 the BAI upheld two complaints about an interview D'Arcy conducted on 9 June 2016 surrounding the United Nations Human Right's Committee periodic assessment of Ireland's human rights record. D'arcy conducted an interview with campaigners for abortion but failed to mention that they were campaigners. The unanimous opinion of the BAI committee was that the program lacked objectivity and impartiality and went so far to note that this was the third time a complaint was upheld against D'Arcy on this issue and it was a matter of concern to them. They issued RTE with a 'Warning Notice' over the violation in order to underline the seriousness.

Personal life
Previously engaged to TV presenter Geri Maye (only for the wedding to be halted at the last minute), D'Arcy married Jenny Kelly, his producer and co-presenter, on 24 August 2013. The pair were stalked by the press when D'Arcy publicly exposed their partnership on Saturday Night With Miriam in 2005. Afterwards, D'Arcy was dismissive of the public interest in the relationship: "I guess once we have actually told people we are together that will be the end of it. Our listeners probably care that we are a couple, but beyond that I don't know why anyone would be interested." Their daughter was born on 25 November 2006 after Jenny went into labour while laughing at Pat Kenny being heckled on The Late Late Show. In January 2012, D'Arcy and Kelly announced their engagement and pregnancy with a second child. In June that year, D'Arcy and Kelly welcomed their second child, a boy. Earlier that year, D'Arcy tripped and broke his nose and had to have surgery.

The D'Arcy family have a dog called Teddy.

D'Arcy's father Ray D'Arcy Sr. died on 28 December 2017.

In December 2018, RTÉ published his salary of €450,000 for 2016, up from €400,000 which he earned in 2015.

Awards
D'Arcy won a Jacob's Award in 1993 for his presentation of The Den. In 2005, 2006 and 2007 Ray won the Best Irish Radio DJ award at the Meteor Music Awards, cementing his position as one of Ireland's most popular radio presenters. D'Arcy always maintains that this should be seen as a group award, and that credit should be shared with Jenny Kelly, Mairead Farrell and producer Will Hanafin, who also contributes to presenting the show. In 2008 D'Arcy was beaten by his namesake Ray Foley who launched a daily campaign to dethrone him.

In 2006, The Ray D'Arcy Show won the Community/Social Action award at the PPI Irish Radio Awards for their work in highlighting road safety problems and deaths on the roads in Ireland. This was due in part, to their "Don't be a Fucking Eejit" radio adverts, which contained real-life stories.

In 2007, The Ray D'Arcy Show won the Best Light Entertainment Programme award at the PPI Irish Radio Awards.

|-
| 1993 || Ray D'Arcy || Jacob's Award || 
|-
| 2005 || Ray D'Arcy || Best Irish DJ at the Meteor Awards || 
|-
| 2006 || Ray D'Arcy || Best Irish DJ at the Meteor Awards || 
|-
| 2006 || The Ray D'Arcy Show || Community/Social Action award at the PPI Irish Radio Awards || 
|-
| 2007 || Ray D'Arcy || Best Irish DJ at the Meteor Awards || 
|-
| 2007 || The Ray D'Arcy Show || Best Light Entertainment Programme award at the PPI Irish Radio Awards || 
|-
| 2008 || Ray D'Arcy || Best Irish DJ at the Meteor Awards || 
|-

References

1964 births
20th-century Irish people
21st-century Irish people
Living people
Alumni of Trinity College Dublin
Irish DJs
Jacob's Award winners
People from County Kildare
RTÉ Radio 1 presenters
RTÉ television presenters
The Den (TV programme) presenters
The Panel (Irish TV series) presenters
Today FM presenters
You're a Star presenters
Electronic dance music DJs
Rose of Tralee hosts